Harris Against the World, also known as 90 Bristol Court: Harris Against the World, is an American situation comedy that stars Jack Klugman in the title role of Alan Harris as the superintendent of a large Hollywood movie studio who is frustrated with most things in his life. It aired from 1964 to 1965.

Synopsis
Alan Harris and his family — wife Kate and children Dee Dee and Billy — live at 90 Bristol Court, a fashionable apartment complex in Los Angeles, California. Harris is the plant superintendent at a large Hollywood movie studio. Kate is a spendthrift who always finds Harris second jobs to work part-time to pay the bills — taking up what little spare time he has — and his two children are very active and hard for him to keep up with. Harris is frustrated and overwhelmed by the many challenges he faces in his life, both at work and at home — with money, his family, his bosses, taxes, and people in general — and is prone to complaining about them, although underneath it all he is a good and soft-hearted person. Helen and Norm Miller are Harris's good friends, and Cliff Murdock is the superintendent and handyman at 90 Bristol Court who frequently greets residents and visitors as they come and go at the apartment complex.

Cast
 Alan Harris — Jack Klugman
 Kate Harris — Patricia Barry
 Dee Dee  Harris — Claire Wilcox
 Billy Harris — David Macklin
 Helen Miller — Fay DeWitt
 Norm Miller — Sheldon Allman
 Cliff Murdock — Guy Raymond

90 Bristol Court

Harris Against the World was one of three 30-minute situation comedies — along with Karen, aired immediately before it, and Tom, Dick and Mary immediately after it — broadcast Monday nights under the umbrella title 90 Bristol Court. Despite all three shows being set at the same Los Angeles apartment complex with the address 90 Bristol Court, the only connection the three series had was the character of handyman Cliff Murdock (portrayed by Guy Raymond), who greeted the residents and visitors to 90 Bristol Court. After the last episodes of Harris Against the World and Tom, Dick and Mary aired on January 4, 1965, 90 Bristol Court ceased to be a programming entity. Although Karen continued to air after the demise of the other two series as a stand-alone show, handyman Murdock disappeared from Karen along with the 90 Bristol Court concept.

Production
Harris Against the World was produced by Kayro-Vue and Universal Television, which also produced The Munsters for CBS that season. Thirteen black-and-white episodes were produced.

Broadcast history

Harris Against the World premiered on NBC on October 5, 1964, and aired at 8:00 p.m. on Monday throughout its run. It drew low ratings — for the November-to-December 1964 reporting period, the Nielsen ratings ranked it 91st among the 96 prime-time network television shows — and was the least-watched of the three 90 Bristol Court series, although Karen and Tom, Dick and Mary did little better. In mid-November 1964 The New York Times reported that NBC planned to cancel both Harris Against the World and Tom, Dick and Mary, effective in early January 1965. Harris Against the World thus lasted only half a season, and the 13th and final episode aired on January 4, 1965.

Peter Tewksbury wrote, produced, and directed all three episodes that aired as part of 90 Bristol Court on November 23, 1964, and used the philosophy of Henry David Thoreau regarding simple living as a starting point for each of them: On Karen, Thoreau influenced Karen and her complicated love life when she mistakenly made three dates for the same Saturday night; on Harris Against the World, Thoreau inspired Harris to take his family fishing, only to find that he has to renew his driver's license that day; and on Tom, Dick and Mary, Dick used Thoreau's philosophy as he attempted to fix several broken household appliances.

Episodes
SOURCES Television Obscurities TV Guide 365: Monday, October 12th, 1964 Accessed 7 November 2021Television Obscurities TV Guide 365: Monday, October 26th, 1964 Accessed 7 November 2021Television Obscurities TV Guide 365: Monday, November 30th, 1964 Accessed 7 November 2021

References

External links

Video of Jack Klugman interview about Harris Against the World at Television Academy Foundation: The Interviews

1964 American television series debuts
1965 American television series endings
1960s American sitcoms
Black-and-white American television shows
English-language television shows
NBC original programming
Television series by Universal Television
Television shows set in Los Angeles